The Big Interview was an Irish talk show, which was broadcast on RTÉ One in 2011.

Presented by veteran broadcaster Mike Murphy, each episode involves Murphy interviewing a well-known public figure. The series was broadcast each Thursday night at 22:15.

The series were recorded in the Convention Centre Dublin.

Episodes

References

External links
 The Big Interview

2011 Irish television series debuts
Irish television talk shows
RTÉ original programming